Secrets of Flying is the second and final album released by Bahamian-American singer-songwriter Johnny Kemp.  Released at the end of 1987, this album featured two massively successful singles.  The album's first hit was the Grammy-nominated single "Just Got Paid", which cracked the top 10 on the Billboard Hot 100 in 1988 and went on to top both the R&B chart and Hot Dance Music/Club Play chart.  The album's second hit, "Dancin' with Myself", also became a top 5 R&B success.  A third single from the album, the slow jam "One Thing Led to Another", reached the R&B top 40 as well.

In February 2012, New Skool Sounds (parent label: Funkytowngrooves) released on compact disc a digitally remastered reissue of the album as an expanded edition including four bonus tracks.

Track listing

+: Bonus tracks on the 2012 reissued version

Notes:
Track 10 mistakenly listed on release as "Just Got Paid (Instrumental)", but it is the Dub Mix version; listed correctly above.
Track 11 mistakenly listed on release as "Just Got Paid (Dub Mix)", but it is the Instrumental version; listed correctly above.

Personnel
"Just Got Paid"
Johnny Kemp: Lead and Background vocals
Teddy Riley: Synthesizers, Drum and Synthesizer programming, Bass Synthesizer, Percussion, Additional Backing vocals
Aaron Hall: Additional Backing vocals

"One Thing Led to Another"
Johnny Kemp: Lead and Background vocals +
Ira Siegel: Guitar
Brian and Shelley Morgan ("Morgan & Morgan"): All other instruments and programming
Yogi Lee: Background vocals

"My Only Want Is You"
Johnny Kemp: Lead vocals +
Fred Zarr: Keyboards
Kashif: Keyboards, Percussion
Jeff Smith: Drum programming, Background vocals
Darroll Gustamachio: Synclavier programming
Yogi Lee: Background vocals

"Dancin' with Myself"
Johnny Kemp: Lead and Background vocals, Vocal arrangements
Vincent Henry: Synthesizers, Drum and Synthesizer programming, Guitars, Bass, Percussion, Saxophone, Synthesizer Bass
Bruce Purse: Keyboards, Trumpet
Eric Rehl: Synthesizers, Synthesizer programming
Bernard Davis: Drums
Rick Gallwey: Percussion
Darroll Gustamachio: Synclavier programming

"Inner City Blues (Make Me Wanna Holler)"
Johnny Kemp: Lead and Background vocals, Vocal Rap, Vocal arrangements
Eric Rehl: Synthesizers, Drum and Synthesizer programming, Synthesizer bass
Vincent Henry: Rhythm and Plucking Guitars
Mike "Dino" Campbell: Rock and Picking Guitars
Bernard Davis: Drums
Rick Gallwey: Percussion

"Mercy Mercy Me"
Johnny Kemp: Lead and Background vocals, Vocal arrangements
Eric Rehl: Synthesizers, Drum and Synthesizer programming, Synthesizer bass
Vincent Henry: Tenor, Alto, and Baritone saxophones, String and horn arrangements
Mike "Dino" Campbell: Guitars
Rick Gallwey: Percussion
Bruce Purse: String and horn arrangements
Darroll Gustamachio: Synclavier programming

"Feeling Without Touching"
Johnny Kemp: Lead and Background vocals, Vocal arrangements
Bruce Purse: Drum programming, Keyboards, Trumpet
Vincent Henry: Bass, Keyboards, Saxophone
Eric Rehl: Synthesizers, Synthesizer programming
Rick Gallwey: Percussion
Darroll Gustamachio: Synclavier programming
Ivy Ray: Female speaking voice
Kashif: Vocal arrangements

"Just Like Flyin'"
Johnny Kemp: Lead and Background vocals, Vocal arrangements
Bruce Purse: Keyboards, Trumpet
Vincent Henry: Rhythm and Picking Guitars
Andy Powell: Lead guitar
Poogie Bell: Drums and Drum Programming, Percussion
Alex Bugnan (sic): Keyboards
Darroll Gustamachio: Synclavier programming
Victor Bailey: Bass

+ Kemp is not officially credited on the album cover as the lead vocalist on "One Thing Led to Another" or "My Only Want Is You".  However, given that he is the primary artist and is credited as lead vocalist on all of the other tracks, it seems like a reasonable assumption to make that he sings lead on these two as well.

References

[ Allmusic]
Discogs

External links
 
 Secrets Of Flying at Discogs
 Facebook Page
 My Space Page

1987 albums
Johnny Kemp albums
Columbia Records albums